Mount Baden-Powell is a peak in the San Gabriel Mountains of California named for the founder of the World Scouting Movement, Robert Baden-Powell, 1st Baron Baden-Powell. It was officially recognized by the USGS at a dedication ceremony in 1931. It was originally known as East Twin or North Baldy.

Geography

The peak is within the Angeles National Forest and San Gabriel Mountains National Monument.

Hiking

The summit has long been a favorite hiking excursion either from the Mount Islip Saddle near Little Jimmy Trail Camp, or the Vincent Gap Trail which leads up a moderate to strenuous set of switchbacks from Wrightwood. The Vincent Gap hike leads through a variety of forested areas consisting of Jeffrey Pine, Ponderosa Pine, Lodgepole Pine, Incense-cedar, and an ancient forest of Limber Pine some of which are more than 2,000 years old.

In 1957 several Southern California councils of the Boy Scouts of America placed a formal marker at the summit with a plaque dedicated to Lord Baden-Powell.

See also 

 Baden-Powell Peak in Nepal

References

External links 
 
 
 
 
 

San Gabriel Mountains
Mountains of Los Angeles County, California
San Gabriel Mountains National Monument
Mountains of Southern California